Sutter Union High School is a small rural high school located in Sutter, California.

History
The high school opened in 1893 with only 18 students. Over 100 years later the school has grown to 700 students and grows with each passing year. This Sutter County school differs from others in the county because of its rural location in the Yuba–Sutter area.

It is currently headed by Ryan Robison, Superintendent/Principal, and Rick Giovannoni, Vice Principal.

Athletics

Sutter Union High School is well known in the Yuba–Sutter area for its skilled athletes and continued success in football, volleyball, girls soccer, baseball and softball. These teams have each won a Northern Section Championship in the past season.  and the wrestling team has won 2 section championships and also many league titles. The softball team has won Northern Section titles in recent years.

The high school offers many different sports, but significantly fewer than the larger schools in the area.

Athletic offerings by gender:
Girls: Volleyball, Tennis, Softball, Basketball, Soccer, Cheerleading.
Boys: Football, Basketball, Baseball, Soccer, Tennis.
Co-Ed: Cross-Country, Track, Rifle Team, Wrestling, Swimming, Trap Team, Golf.

Extracurriculars

Sutter Union High School features many groups and clubs including: CSF (California Scholarship Federation), FBLA (Future Business Leaders of America), FNL (Friday Night Live), FFA (Future Farmers of America), Interact Club, Key Club, Loud Crowd, ACE (Architecture, Construction and Engineering Mentor Program), JSA (Junior Statesmen of America),and Drama.

Notable alumni
Guy Branum, Head writer and performer on X-Play
Leanne Marshall, Season 5 winner of Project Runway on Bravo
Logan Seavey, NASCAR, ARCA, USAC, POWRi driver
Don Young, Alaska's only Congressman.

References

External links 
 

Yuba City, California
High schools in Sutter County, California
Public high schools in California
Educational institutions established in 1893
1893 establishments in California